The following players were selected to play in the 2008 Under-19 Cricket World Cup.

Australia
The following players were selected for Australia's squad:
 Michael Hill (c)
 Phillip Hughes (vc)
 Daniel Burns
 Michael Cranmer
 James Faulkner
 Josh Hazlewood
 David King
 Dom O'Brien (wk)
 Kirk Pascoe
 James Pattinson
 Clive Rose
 Kumar Sarna
 Jeremy Smith
 Steve Smith
 Marcus Stoinis

Bangladesh
The following players were selected for Bangladesh's squad:
 Suhrawadi Shuvo (c)
 Amit Majumder
 Ashiqul Islam (wk)
 Ashraful Hossain
 Dolar Mahmud
 Golam Kibria
 Mahmudul Hasan
 Mohammad Mithun (wk)
 Mohammad Shakil
 Nadimuddin
 Nasir Hossain
 Rony Talukdar
 Rubel Hossain
 Shykat Ali
 Subashis Roy

Bermuda
The following players were selected for Bermuda's squad:
 Rodney Trott (c)
 Malachi Jones (vc)
 Machai Campbell
 Deunte Darrell
 Jordan DeSilva
 Chris Douglas
 Terryn Fray
 Tre Govia
 Kyle Hodsoll
 Dennico Hollis
 Greg Maybury
 McLaren Smith
 Pierre Smith (wk)
 Regino Smith (wk)
 Tamauri Tucker

England
The following players were selected for England's squad:
 Alex Wakely (c)
 Ben Brown (wk)
 Liam Dawson
 Steven Finn
 Billy Godleman
 James Goodman
 James Harris
 James Lee
 Stuart Meaker
 Sam Northeast
 Dan Redfern
 James Taylor
 Tom Westley
 Chris Woakes
 Greg Wood (wk)

India
The following players were selected for India's squad:
 Virat Kohli (c)
 Ravindra Jadeja (vc)
 Ajitesh Argal
 Napoleon Einstein
 Shreevats Goswami (wk)
 Perry Goyal (wk)
 Iqbal Abdulla
 Siddarth Kaul
 Taruwar Kohli
 Abhinav Mukund
 Manish Pandey
 Pradeep Sangwan
 Duvvarapu Siva Kumar
 Tanmay Srivastava
 Saurabh Tiwary

Ireland
The following players were selected for Ireland's squad:
 Andy Balbirnie (wk) (c)
 Ben Ackland
 Andrew Britton
 Chris Dougherty
 Shane Getkate
 James Hall
 Richard Keaveney
 Theo Lawson
 Gavin McKenna
 Graham McDonnell
 Lee Nelson
 Stuart Poynter (wk)
 James Shannon
 Paul Stirling

Malaysia
The following players were selected for Malaysia's squad:
 Ahmad Faiz (c)
 Faris Almas (vc)
 Sarath Ananthasivam
 Faizal Abu Hasan
 Fauzi Arifin
 Kasman Kaderi
 Mohammad Miran
 Nik Arifin
 Norwira Zazmie
 Aminuddin Ramly
 Saravanan Raj
 Shafiq Sharif (wk)
 Shahid Ali Khan
 Suharril Fetri

Namibia
The following players were selected for Namibia's squad:
 Dawid Botha (c)
 Claude Bouwer
 Gert Jan Coetzee
 Morne Engelbrecht
 Tiaan Louw
 Elandre Oosthuizen
 Bernard Scholtz
 Sean Silver
 Ewald Steenkamp
 Keady Strauss
 Louis van der Westhuizen
 Martin van Niekerk
 Ashley van Rooi
 Raymond van Schoor
 Pikky Ya France

Nepal
The following players were selected for Nepal's squad:
 Paras Khadka (c)
 Gyanendra Malla (vc)
 Amrit Bhattarai
 Mahesh Chhetri
 Akash Gupta
 Sagar Khadka
 Anil Mandal
 Subash Pradhan (wk)
 Abhaya Rana
 Chandra Sawad
 Raj Shrestha
 Rom Shrestha
 Antim Thapa
 Puspa Thapa
 Rahul Vishwakarma

New Zealand
The following players were selected for New Zealand's squad:
 Kane Williamson (c)
 Corey Anderson
 Nick Beard
 Harry Boam
 Trent Boult
 Michael Bracewell
 Tamati Clarke
 Fraser Colson
 Andrew Dodd
 Michael Guptill-Bunce (wk)
 Greg Morgan
 Hamish Rutherford
 Tim Southee
 Anurag Verma
 George Worker

Pakistan
The following players were selected for Pakistan's squad:
 Imad Wasim (c)
 Shan Masood (vc)
 Adil Raza
 Ahmed Shehzad
 Ahsan Jamil
 Ali Asad
 Azhar Attari
 Junaid Khan
 Kamran Hussain
 Mohammad Rameez
 Shahzaib Ahmed
 Umair Mir (wk)
 Umar Akmal
 Umar Amin
 Usman Salahuddin

Papua New Guinea
The following players were selected for Papua New Guinea's squad:
 Colin Amini (c)
 Alfred Amini
 Charles Amini
 Jonathan Diho
 Arua Dikana
 Willie Gavera
 Tanti Heni
 Jason Kila
 Jacob Mado
 Loa Nou
 John Reva
 Heni Siaka
 Joel Tom
 Tony Ura
 Archie Vala

South Africa
The following players were selected for South Africa's squad:
 Wayne Parnell (c)
 Roy Adams
 Matthew Arnold
 Clayton August
 Bradley Barnes (wk)
 Daniel Childs
 Sybrand Engelbrecht
 Reeza Hendricks
 Pieter Malan
 Mangaliso Mosehle (wk)
 Obus Pienaar
 Rilee Rossouw
 JJ Smuts
 Yaseen Vallie
 Jonathan Vandiar

Sri Lanka
The following players were selected for Sri Lanka's squad:
 Ashan Priyanjan (c)
 Dinesh Chandimal (wk)
 Denuwan Fernando
 Ishan Jayaratne
 Umesh Karunaratne
 Navin Kavikara
 Dilshan Munaweera
 Sachith Pathirana
 Chathura Peiris
 Angelo Perera
 Kusal Perera
 Thisara Perera
 Roshen Silva
 Lahiru Thirimanne
 Imesh Udayanga

West Indies
The following players were selected for the West Indie's squad:
 Shamarh Brooks (c)
 Steven Jacobs (vc)
 Adrian Barath
 Nkrumah Bonner
 Darren Bravo
 Kyle Corbin
 Andre Creary
 Jason Dawes
 Dawnley Grant
 Delorn Johnson
 Horace Miller
 Veerasammy Permaul
 Kieran Powell
 Devon Thomas (wk)
 Shacaya Thomas

Zimbabwe
The following players were selected for Zimbabwe's squad:
 Prince Masvaure (c)
 Justin Gaisford
 Tinashe Chimbambo (wk)
 Tendai Chitongo
 Hughes Dinembira
 Kyle Jarvis
 Edzai Jaure
 Daniel Landman
 Tendai Mashonganyika
 Stewart Matsika
 Solomon Mire
 Peter Moor
 Tinotenda Mutombodzi
 Njabulo Ncube
 Reginald Nehonde

References

ICC Under-19 Cricket World Cup squads
ICC Under-19 Cricket World Cup